Buis-sur-Damville (literally Buis on Damville) is a former commune in the Eure department in Normandy in northern France. On 1 January 2019, it was merged into the commune Mesnils-sur-Iton.

Population

See also
Communes of the Eure department

References

External links

Official site

Former communes of Eure